The history of rail transport in Turkey began with the start of the placement in 1856 of a  railway line between Izmir and Aydın. The first finished Ottoman railway line was a  line between Köstence (Constanţa, Romania today) and Boğazköy (Cernavodă, Romania today) built in 1859-1860.

The state corporation that manages the Turkish railway system, Turkish State Railways, subdivides the history into the Pre-Republic period (Ottoman period), the Republic period (which extends from 1923 to 1950) and the period after 1950. During the first period, railways were built and operated by foreign concerns with permission from the state. In the second, the state took over its own railways and expanded them in support of Turkish financial interests. In the third period, attention turned from rail travel to highways, and the expansion of railways dramatically slowed.

Ottoman Empire period
During the period of the Ottoman Empire British, French and German concerns funded and ran private railways in Turkey having gotten permits to do so from the state.

İzmir-Aydın railway (1860-)

The first railway to be constructed in Turkey was the Izmir-Aydin line, the first part of which was opened in 1860. Further construction and extension of the line continued up to 1912, by which time the total length was in excess of 700 km.

İzmir-Turgutlu railway (1865-)

The second railway to be opened was the Izmir-Turgutlu railway. As with the Izmir-Aydin line expansion continued for several decades, and by 1912 the total length was well in excess of 500 km.

European (Şark) railway (1871-)

In 1871 the Yenikapı to Florya section of the Sark railway opened, further lines were added in the years 1872 and 1873 to create 288 km of lines. A further extension was added in 1912 of 46 km.

Anatolian railway (1872-)

The first section of the Anatolian railway (Anadolu demiryollari) opened in 1872, and the line saw constant growth through the next three decades.

Mersin Tarsus Adana railway (1882-)

The Mersin to Adana opened the section to Yenice in 1882, and was completed, having reached Adana by 1886.

Baghdad railway (1904-)

The Baghdad (modern day Iraq) railway extended into Turkey, with lines reaching Konya and other parts of western Turkey.

Cenup railway (1912-)
First opened in 1912.

Republican Period (1920-1950)
During the Turkish War of Independence, the new breakaway government in Ankara held control over sections of railways located in central and southern Anatolia. In 1920, these were brought under the roof of Chemin de Fer d'Anatolie ("Anadolu Şimendiferleri" - distinct from "Ottoman Anatolian Railways") with its center in Ankara and administered by Behiç Erkin, the founding figure of modern Turkey's railway network and a colonel at the time. Erkin pursued his office as director general beyond the war during a crucial period that lasted until 1926, after which he was Turkey's minister for transports for two years.

In 1923, Turkish railways entered into what the Turkish State Railways term the "Republic Period", a "golden age" that lasted until 1950. During this time, the railways that had already been created were repurposed to serve Turkish financial interests, prioritizing industrial growth in such industries as iron, steel and coal. In addition to claiming existing lines, the Turkish government extended lines into the previously underrepresented Central and Eastern areas of Turkey to achieve near balance. Between 1935 and 1945, emphasis was placed on construction of junction lines, to improve industrial connectivity and also strengthen national defense. As a result, distance of travel between various points was significantly shortened.

During this period, the following main routes were constructed:
Ankara-Kayseri-Sivas
Sivas-Erzurum (Caucasus line)
Samsun-Kalin (near Sivas)
Irmak-Filyos (Zonguldak ( coal line)
Adana-Fevzipaşa-Diyarbakır  ( Copper line)
Sivas-Çetinkaya (Iron line)

1950s forward 
According to the Turkish State Railways, beginning in 1950 the railways of Turkey were ignored and neglected as focus turned to highways. In the early part of the period, the improvement of the roadway system was conceived to support the rail system, but instead of the coordinated building of both road and rail structures intended, railroad constructed slowed dramatically. In the 1980s, the national transportation plan "1983-1993 Transportation Interim Planning" was adopted with a goal in part of decreasing highway transportation share from 72% to 36%, but the plan was abolished in 1986 without implementation. In 2002, only 4% of freight transported in Turkey traveled by rail, and only 2% of passenger travel was conducted by rail.

Proposed lines 
 Kars to Nakhchivan in Azerbaijan

Museums 
 TCDD Open Air Steam Locomotive Museum in Ankara
 Istanbul Railway Museum
 Çamlık Railway Museum
 Rahmi M. Koç Museum

Timeline of railway investment and construction under the Ottoman Empire

(Notes on investors: O: Ottoman Empire, A: Austria, B: Belgium, F: France, G: Germany, S: Switzerland, UK: United Kingdom, Int'l: International investors; Source: Roth - Dinhobl, p. 188)

See also

Orient Express 
Narrow gauge railways in Turkey
Rail transport in Turkey
Turkish State Railways

References

Notes

Books

External links

Trains of Turkey – "A site for the Turkish Railway Enthusiast" Comprehensive information on the Turkish railway system, including historical information.
Turkish State Railways : RAILWAYS POLICIES THROUGHOUT THE 80 YEARS HISTORY OF OUR REPUBLIC www.tcdd.gov.tr
Turkish museum of transport Rahmi : M Koç Museum www.rmk-museum.org.tr

Rail transport in Turkey
Turkey
Ottoman railways
Rail